Jitra (Jawi: جترا) is a town and a mukim in Kubang Pasu District, in northern Kedah, Malaysia. It is the fourth-largest town in Kedah after Alor Setar, Sungai Petani and Kulim.

History
During World War II, when the Japanese attacked Malaya, Jitra was on the one of main lines of defence set up by the British. One of the fiercest battles during the British defence of Malaya were fought here.

Notable natives
Antara orang yang terkenal di Jitra adalah Mohd Johari Baharum (bekas Timbalan Menteri Dalam Negeri) Wan Iskandar Azam Rocky (5 kali Kejuaraan Golf Amatur ASEAN), Azrul dan Nidzom (pengerusi dan Ketua Pegawai Eksekutif Bahagia Holdings) dan Muhamad Aiman Remy Shahar (pengamal dan pakar IT dari Taman Tunku Sarina 2).

Places in Jitra

Local Location

 Asun 
 Ayer Hitam 
 Bandar Baru Bukit Kayu Hitam 
 Bandar Darulaman 
 Bandar Baru Sintok 
 Bandar Jitra
 Changlun
 Felda Batu Lapan 
 Felda Bukit Tangga 
 Felda Guar Napai 
 Felda Laka Selatan 
 Hosba
 Kg. Siputeh 
 Kepala Batas
 Kodiang
 Malau  
 Megat Dewa
 Napo
 Padang Sera
 Permatang Bonglai 
 Sanglang 
 Sintok (UUM)
 Suasana Permai  
 Tanah Merah (Jitra)
 Kg. Bukit
 Kg. Pulau Ketam
 Kg. Pulau Nyior
 Tunjang
 Wang Tepus
 Pida 4 Tunjang
 Kg. Darat
 Kg. Imam
 Kg. Gurindam
 Kg. Wang Perah
 Kg. Sungai Korok

Interesting Location
  Taman Tunku Sarina 2
  Rimba Rekreasi Bukit Wang, near to North-East Highway PLUS (8 km) exit via Malau
  Taman Tasik Bandar Darulaman
  Universiti Utara Malaysia
  Duty Free Zone Bukit Kayu Hitam 
  Jitra Mall
  Lye Huat Garden
  Training and Recreation Centre Paya Pahlawan

Tourist attractions
A few famous landmarks in Jitra are Darulaman Park, Jitra Waterfront (behind police quarters), Rocky Dog Park, Tasik Darulaman with new Waterpark adventure (Fantasia Aquapark), Cendol Pulut Jo and Bukit Wang, a recreational park. Located approximately 30 kilometres from Thailand border, Jitra becomes one of the many stops for tourists who came from the neighboring country or Malaysian who wanted to visit Thailand.

Not far from the town, a project located at Paya Pahlawan was developed in 2003. This project promotes the concept of frozen food industries with Kedah Halal Food Hub (KHFH) as its main distributor. A complex for slaughtering cows was built and it is equipped with slaughter house and cold storage that can store meat up to 1,500 tons at a time. This center can cover up to 30 percent of Malaysia's need for beef, which comes in handy especially during Malaysia's many festivals such as Hari Raya Aidilfitri and Hari Raya Qurban.

Transportation

Car 
Highway 1 is the main route into Jitra town, from the state capital Alor Setar, and all the way to Bukit Kayu Hitam and the border with Thailand.

Public transportation 
KTM Intercity/ETS however does not serve Jitra. Closest stations are Anak Bukit (with intercity and Komuter services) and Kodiang (Komuter only).

See also
 Battle of Jitra

References

External links

Towns and Cities in Malaysia

Kubang Pasu District
Mukims of Kedah